The Jimi Homeless Experience is a comedy rock act created, produced and managed by Jon Kinyon.  The band performs mainly in and around Hollywood, CA.  A full-length parody album of Jimi Hendrix' biggest hits, entitled Are You Homeless?, was released on August 23, 2007, the 40th anniversary of the release of Jimi Hendrix' first LP Are You Experienced.

With over 23 million monthly listeners on Spotify, the band remains one of the most successful parody bands in music history, alongside "Weird Al" Yankovic and Tenacious D.

The band
Personnel on the album Are You Homeless?:
 Josh Curtis – vocals, bass guitar;
 Jason DeCorse – guitar;
 Kevin Zelch – drums.

The line-up of the touring band consists of:
 Josh Curtis – vocals;
 Jason DeCorse – guitar;
 Bill Lanham – bass guitar;
 Ron Pak – drums.

Other members who have played live shows:
 Tim Hogan – bass guitar;
 Robin Johnson – bass guitar;
 Gary Davenport – bass guitar;
 Chad Stewart – drums;
 Shay Godwinn – drums;
 Jon Kinyon – dj.

Discography
 2007: Are You Homeless?
 2009: Band of Junkys

Related Works
 The Jimi Homeless Experience (webcomic)
 A Jimi Homeless stop motion animation was featured on MyToons, a YouTube-styled website specifically geared for and 3-D animation, in March 2008.

References

External links
 Official site
 The Jimi Homeless Experience parody album
 Jimi Homeless Experience webcomic

American comedy musical groups
American novelty song performers
American parodists
American satirists
Musical groups established in 2007
Musical groups from Los Angeles
Parody musicians
Comedy rock musical groups
Comedians from California